The 2001 World Games, the sixth World Games, were an international multi-sport event held in Akita, Japan.

Titles
140 titles (invitational sports not included) were awarded in the following official sports. There were five invitational sports in this edition.

Sports 
The 2001 World Games programme featured 27 official sports and 4 invitational sports. (Aikido was deemed a demonstration sport; no medal events were held.) The numbers in parentheses indicate the number of medal events that were contested in each sports discipline.

I

I

I

 

Notes
I: Invitational sports, selected by the host city

Medal count

Official sports
The results from the 2001 World Games are from the archived website of the Akita, Japan, organizing committee. The medal tally during the sixth World Games is as follows. Russia finished at the top of the final medal table.

Invitational sports

References

External links
 The IWGA
 Medal table

 
2001
2001 World Games
International sports competitions hosted by Japan
World Games
World Games
Sport in Akita (city)
Sports competitions in Akita Prefecture